Bernard Tomic was the defending champion, but retired in the first round of the qualifying tournament against Denis Istomin.

Pablo Carreño Busta won the title, defeating Alexander Bublik in the final, 6–7(5–7), 6–4, 7–6(7–3).

Seeds
The top four seeds received a bye into the second round.

Draw

Finals

Top half

Bottom half

Qualifying

Seeds

Qualifiers

Lucky loser

Qualifying draw

First qualifier

Second qualifier

Third qualifier

Fourth qualifier

References

External links
 Main draw
 Qualifying draw

2019 ATP Tour
2019 Singles
2019 in Chinese tennis